Ingrid Figur (born 1934) is a German soprano  and singing teacher.

Career 
Born in Berlin, Figur studied in her hometown, first German studies, then music at school to become a teacher, finally followed by her singing studies. She then began a career, both in the repertoire of the lied and the oratorio, in and outside Germany.

Since 1974, she has been teaching singing at the Berlin University of the Arts, and as a professor from 1980 to 1999. Figur trained many of the singers known today at national and international level. Among her students are in particular Claudia Barainsky, Stella Doufexis, Ursula Hesse, Andrea Long, Sebastian Noack, Christine Schäfer, Mojca Erdmann,  and Tim Severloh.

Particularly noteworthy is her long collaboration and membership to the Internationale Bachakademie Stuttgart, as well as the Berlin nichi-doku Liederkreis (Deutsch-japanische Sommerakademie für Gesang und Liedbegleitung). In addition, she gives numerous master classes in Germany and other countries.

References 

1934 births
Living people
Singers from Berlin
German sopranos
German music educators
Academic staff of the Berlin University of the Arts
Women music educators
20th-century German women singers